The 2010 Furman Paladins football team was an American football team that represented Furman University as a member of the Southern Conference (SoCon) during the 2010 NCAA Division I FCS football season. In their ninth year under head coach Bobby Lamb, the Paladins compiled an overall record of 5–6 with a conference mark of 3–5, finishing sixth in the SoCon.

Schedule

References

Furman
Furman Paladins football seasons
Furman Paladins football